Sur un air de mambo is a 1996 television film directed by Jean-Louis Bertuccelli and written by him and Sabine Ullmann. It stars Catherine Jacob and it was broadcast on France 2 in 1996.

Main cast
 Catherine Jacob as Arlette
 Bernard Alane as Jérôme
 Jean-Paul Muel as Louis
 Betty Bomonde as Marguerite
 Jean-Jacques Moreau as Gilles
 Anna Gaylor as Yvonne
 Rosa Lobato Faria as Madame Rosa
 Reine Bartève as Madame Castang
 Sylvie Flepp as Madame Mercier
 Manuela Cassola as Madame Manuela
 Peter Michael as Pedro
 Suzana Borges as Brigitte
 Alexandre de Sousa as Dr. Bernachon
 José Pedro Gomes as The contractor

Awards and nominations
Catherine Jacob won the Golden Goblet Award for Best Actress to the 1996 Shanghai International Film Festival. She's the first and only French actress to win this prize.

References

External links

French television films
1996 television films
1996 films
1990s French-language films
1990s romance films
Films directed by Jean-Louis Bertuccelli
1990s French films